Gaamo Zone is a zone in the Southern Nations, Nationalities, and Peoples' Region of Ethiopia. Gaamo is bordered on the south by the Dirashe special woreda, on the southwest by Debub (South) Omo and the Basketo special woreda, on the northwest by Konta special woreda, on the north by Dawro and Wolayita, on the northeast by the Lake Abaya which separates it from the Oromia Region, and on the southeast by the Amaro special woreda. The administrative center of Gaamo  is Arba Minch. 

Gaamo  has 431 kilometers of all-weather roads and 1000 kilometers of dry-weather roads, for an average road density of 45 kilometers per 1000 square kilometers. The highest point in this Zone is Mount Gughe (4,207 meters above sea level). The Lake Chamo is located at the southeastern part of Gamo  just south of Lake Abaya. The Nechisar National Park is located between these two lakes.

Originally Gaamo was part of the Semien (North) Omo Zone, and the 1994 national census counted its inhabitants as part of that Zone. However friction between the various ethnic groups in Semien Omo, which was often blamed on the Welayta for "ethnic chauvinism" and despite the efforts of the ruling party to emphasize the need to co-ordinate, consolidate, and unify the smaller ethnic units to achieve the "efficient use of scarce government resources", eventually led to the division of the Zone in 2000, resulting with the creation of not only the Gamo Gofa, but also the Dawro and Wolayita Zones and two special woredas.

Gaamo music plays a prominent role in national entertainment in Ethiopia. The unique and fast-paced Gaamo tunes have influenced several styles and rhythm as it continues to shape the identity of Ethiopian musical diversity. Various famous Ethiopian artists from other ethnic groups have incorporated Gaamo musical style into their songs, including vocalists Tibebu Workeye, Teddy afro and Tsehaye Yohannes. Just as influential are Gaamo traditional dance forms that are often adopted by musicians and widely visible in Ethiopian music videos.

The Gaamo people are an Ethiopian ethnic group located in the Gamo Highlands of Southern Ethiopia. They are found in more than 40 communities, including Chencha, Bonke, Kucha, Garbansa, Zargula, Kamba, Dorze, Birbir, Ochello, Boroda, Ganta, Gacho Baba, Eligo, Shella, Kolle, Dita, Kogota and Daramalo.

Demographics 

Based on the 2007 Census conducted by the Central Statistical Agency of Ethiopia (CSA), this Zone has a total population of 1659310 of whom 779332 are men and 879782 women; with an area of 18,010.99 square kilometers, Gamo Gofa has a population density of 144.68. While 157,446 or 9.88% are urban inhabitants, a further 480 or 0.03% are pastoralists. A total of 337,199 households were counted in this Zone, which results in an average of 4.72 persons to a household, and 324,919 housing units. The largest ethnic groups reported in this Zone included the Gamo (64.61%), the Gofa (22.08%), the Oyda (2.35%), the Amhara (2.32%), the Welayta (1.91%), and the Basketo (1.38%); all other ethnic groups made up 5.35% of the population. Gamo is spoken as a first language by 63.75% of the inhabitants, 22.01% Gofa, 3.47% Amharic, 2.31% Basketo, 1.83% Oyda, and 1.74% Welayta; the remaining 4.89% spoke all other primary languages reported. 53.41% of the population said they were Protestants, 31.54% practiced Ethiopian Orthodox Christianity, and 11.13% observed traditional religions.

Woredas 
Current woredas are:

 Arba Minch Town
 Arba Minch Zuria
 Bonke
 Boreda
 Chencha
 Dita
 Deramalo
 Kemba
 Kucha
 [Kucha Alpha]]
 Mirab Abaya
 Geresse woreda
 Gacho Baba woreda
 Kogota Woreda
Garda Marta Woreda
  Geressie Town Administration
 Chencha Town Administration
Kamba Town Administration
 Birbir Town Administration
[[ Selam Ber City Administration
Former woredas are:
 Boreda Abaya
 Dita Dermalo
 Gofa Zuria
 Zala Ubamale

References

Further reading

 Desalegn Kebede Kaza, The Enforcement of Rights of Gamo People of Ethiopia: An Approach for Indigenous People's Self-Determined Development, 2012. 

Southern Nations, Nationalities, and Peoples' Region
Zones of Ethiopia
Zones in Southern Nations, Nationalities, and Peoples' Region